Petropavlovsk is a rural locality (a selo) and the administrative center of Petropavlovsky Rural Okrug in Ust-Maysky District of the Sakha Republic, Russia, located  from Ust-Maya, the administrative center of the district. Its population as of the 2002 Census was 944.

References

Notes

Sources
Official website of the Sakha Republic. Registry of the Administrative-Territorial Divisions of the Sakha Republic. Ust-Maysky District. 

Rural localities in Ust-Maysky District